The 1933 Rose Bowl was the 19th Rose Bowl game, an American post-season college football game that was played on a day after New Year's Day 1933 in Pasadena, California. It featured two undefeated teams, the Pittsburgh Panthers against the USC Trojans.

Scoring

First Quarter
USC – Wehunt, 33-yard pass from Griffith (Smith kick good)

Third Quarter
USC – Homer Griffith, 1-yard pass from Bright (Smith kick good)

Fourth Quarter
USC – Cotton Warburton, 1-yard run (Smith kick good)
USC – Warburton, 11-yard run (Smith kick good)
USC – Barber, 2-yard run (Lady kick good) Coaches

Game notes

Losing by 35 points, Pittsburgh set a school record of worst defeat up to this time.

References

Rose Bowl
Rose Bowl Game
Pittsburgh Panthers football bowl games
USC Trojans football bowl games
Rose Bowl
January 1933 sports events
January 1933 events in the United States